HMS Squirrel was a development of the standardize 20-gun sixth rates and were built at the beginning of the 18th Century. After commissioning she was captured by French privateers off Hythe in September 1703.

Squirrel was the third named ship since it was used for a discovery vessel with Sir Humphrey Gilbert in 1682 and lost in 1583.

Construction
She was ordered on in 1702 from Portsmouth Dockyard to be built under the guidance of their Master Shipwright, Thomas Podd. She was launched on 14 June 1703.

Commissioned Service
She was commissioned in 1703 under the command of Commander Gilbert Talbot, RN.

Disposition
She was taken by French privateers off Hythe on 21 September 1703.

Notes

Citations

References
 Winfield, British Warships in the Age of Sail (1603 – 1714), by Rif Winfield, published by Seaforth Publishing, England © 2009, EPUB , Chapter 6, The Sixth Rates, Vessels acquired from 18 December 1688, Sixth Rates of 20 guns and up to 26 guns, Nightingale Group, Squirrel
 Colledge, Ships of the Royal Navy, by J.J. Colledge, revised and updated by Lt Cdr Ben Warlow and Steve Bush, published by Seaforth Publishing, Barnsley, Great Britain, © 2020, e  (EPUB), Section S (Squirrel)

 

1700s ships
Corvettes of the Royal Navy
Ships built in Portsmouth
Naval ships of the United Kingdom